Whitehead's woolly bat (Kerivoula whiteheadi) is a species of vesper bat in the family Vespertilionidae.
It is found in Brunei, Indonesia, Malaysia, the Philippines, and Thailand.

References

Kerivoulinae
Bats of Southeast Asia
Bats of Indonesia
Bats of Malaysia
Mammals of Brunei
Mammals of the Philippines
Mammals of Thailand
Least concern biota of Asia
Taxonomy articles created by Polbot
Mammals described in 1894
Taxa named by Oldfield Thomas